, formerly known as Matsugane stable and Nishonoseki stable, is a stable of sumo wrestlers. It was founded in 1990 as Matsugane stable by Wakashimazu who branched out from the Futagoyama stable. It has produced five top makuuchi division wrestlers;  (2000), Wakatsutomu (2001),  Harunoyama (2004), Shōhōzan (2011) and Ichiyamamoto (2021). After the retirement of Harunoyama in November 2006 the stable had no sekitori until Shōhōzan (then known as Matsutani) reached the jūryō division in March 2010. As of January 2023 it had 8 wrestlers.

In late 2014, the general consensus among those with connections to the Nishonoseki ichimon was that an ichimon so named without a Nishonoseki stable as its head was a misnomer. In accordance with this general opinion, the oyakata of Matsugane stable, which had absorbed support personnel from the defunct Nishonoseki when it closed, decided to revive the name. He switched his Matsugane elder name with the former Tamarikidō's Nishonoseki elder name, thus allowing him to rename the stable. The former Tamarikidō, now known as Matsugane-oyakata, also joined the newly renamed stable.

In December 2021 the Japan Sumo Association approved the transfer of the stable to Hanaregoma (former sekiwake Tamanoshima); the stable changed its name to Hanaregoma stable accordingly. Nishonoseki oyakata swapped elder names with former yokozuna Kisenosato, and became Araiso-oyakata.

Ring name conventions
Some wrestlers at this stable take ring names or shikona that begin with the character 若 (read: waka), meaning young, in deference to their former coach and the stable's founder, the former Wakashimazu.

Owner
2021 to present: Hanaregoma Arata (iin, former sekiwake Tamanoshima)
1990–2021: (former ōzeki Wakashimazu), known as Matsugane from 1990 to 2014 and Nishonoseki from 2014 to 2021

Notable active wrestlers

Ichiyamamoto (best rank maegashira)
 (best rank jūryō)

Coaches
Araiso Mutsuo (former ōzeki Wakashimazu)
Minatogawa Tadamitsu (iin  former komusubi Daitetsu)
Matsugane Hideki (iin, former maegashira Tamarikidō)

Notable former members
Shōhōzan (former komusubi)
Harunoyama (former maegashira)
Wakatsutomu (former maegashira)

Referees
Shikimori Kindayū (makuuchi gyōji, real name Hiromitsu Oshida, nephew of Kirinji Kazuharu)
Shikimori Shinnosuke (jūryō gyōji, real name Yōji Mizutani)

Ushers
Matsuo (jūryō yobidashi, real name Yoshihiro Mine)
Satoru (jūryō yobidashi, real name Satoru Asakura)

Hairdressers
Tokohira (1st class tokoyama)
Tokoshima (1st class tokoyama)

Location and access
Chiba prefecture, Funabashi City , Kosaku 4-13-1
10 minute walk from Funabashihōten Station on Musashino Line

See also 
List of sumo stables
List of active sumo wrestlers
List of past sumo wrestlers
Glossary of sumo terms

References

External links 
Hanaregoma stable page at Japan Sumo Association 
Homepage

Active sumo stables